Silent Poets is a Japanese electronic duo (now solo project). They have released six original albums and more than seven remix albums/EPs until now. Gaining international recognition, Silent Poets has been featured in countless music/fashion magazines, and in over 30 compilations around the world ranging from the USA, UK, France, Germany, and Italy, including the well known "Cafe Del Mar" compilation.

Their music style is in the best Acid Jazz / Down-tempo traditions and have something in common with such artists as their countryman DJ Krush, United Future Organization, DJ Cam, etc. Among the characteristic features the deep piano parts, rich colourful orchestra sound and undulating charming rhythm could be highlighted. The Silent Poets collaborate with such electronic / pop / rap music stars as ACO, Port Of Notes, Coldcut, Frederic Galliano, Attica Blues, Yasushi Ide, DJ Vadim, Kid Loco, Towa Tei, Spiritual Vibes, Shakkazombie, Ken Hirai, and Ursula Rucker.

The Silent Poets speak the universal language of music, whether amongst themselves on the instrumental "Mass" (off 1996's Firm Roots) or supported by guests such as Last Poets Jalaluddin Mansur Nuriddin and Sulieman El-Hadi on "Inquizative, Derivative" (off 1994's Words and Silence).

History
Silent Poets was formed by Michiharu Shimoda in 1991. Their first meaningful work was the album Potential Meeting released in 1992 on Toy's Factory. After releasing their fifth album To Come..., Haruno left the group and Silent Poets became Shimoda's solo project. After that Shimoda composed music for fashion shows, released a huge number of remixes. The 2005 album, Sun, was released after a six year gap in recordings.

In 2018, Silent Poets released the album dawn, featuring the song "Asylums for the Feeling." The song would be used in Hideo Kojima's game Death Stranding, appearing both in marketing and in the final game. Silent Poets would also compose one of the songs for the end credits. Silent Poets currently composes the music for Kojima's weekly Spotify podcast Hideo Kojima presents Brain Structure.

Discography

CD
 Potential Meeting (1993, Toy's Factory)
 Words and Silence (1994, Toy's Factory)
 drawing (1995 Toy's Factory)
 Firm Roots (1996, Toy's Factory)
 For Nothing (1997, Toy's Factory)
 To Come... (1999, Toy's Factory)
 Sun (2005, Rush! Production)
 Another Trip from Sun (2013, Another Trip)
 dawn (2018, Another Trip)

Singles and EPs
 "La Vie"/"Shalom" 12“ (1994, Bellissima Records)
 "Drawing" CD/LP (1995, Toy's Factory)
 Cherry Tree EP CD/12 (1997, Toy's Factory)
 Sugar Man EP CD (1999, Toy's Factory)
 "Save the Day" 12“ (2000, Yellow Productions)
 "Someday" 12“ (2000, Yellow Productions)
 "Almost Nothing" feat. Okay Kaya (2019, Another Trip)

Soundtrack
 A Woman Like You (1993)
 Tori (2004)
 Death Stranding (2019)
 Hideo Kojima presents Brain Structure (2022)

Compilations
 Cafe Del Mar vol 2 (dos), 1995
 Funkungfusion from Ninja Tunes, 1998
 X-Mix: Fast Forward & Rewind

References

External links

 Official website

Living people
Japanese electronic musicians
Remixers
Ninja Tune artists
Vadim, DJ
Year of birth missing (living people)